The New Zealand University Games is a multi-sport competition held annually in each March / April between teams fielded from a large number of New Zealand Universities and tertiary institutions. It was formerly known as the Easter Tournament.

The first University Games was held in 1902 with 3 sports being contested - Tennis, Athletics and Debating. The games are run by University Sport New Zealand (USNZ), working closely with its member Students’ Associations and national sporting organisations; USNZ operates national, regional and international inter-university sporting competitions. The Games is the flagship event on the university sporting calendar and attracts 2200 participants in more than 30 sports and is one of the largest annual multi-sport events in New Zealand.

The Shield 
The Shield is awarded to the Games Overall University Champion and was first awarded in 1923. The shield shows the sporting prowess of the Universities in New Zealand and the ongoing challenge to be the best. Otago University has been dominant in the past games winning the shield an impressive 35 times, with the next closest challenger Auckland and Canterbury Universities winning 13 times a piece.

Competing Institutes 

 University of Auckland
 Auckland University of Technology
 Massey University - Albany
 University of Waikato
 Massey University - Palmerston North
 Victoria University of Wellington
 Massey University - Wellington
 University of Canterbury
 Lincoln University
 University of Otago
 Southern Institute of Technology (2010)
 Eastern Institute of Technology

Winners of the New Zealand University Games 

 1902-22 No overall award
 1923 Otago
 1924 Otago
 1925 Canterbury
 1926 Auckland
 1927 Auckland
 1928 Victoria
 1929 Auckland
 1930 Auckland
 1932 Canterbury
 1933 Canterbury
 1934 Canterbury
 1935 Canterbury
 1936 Canterbury
 1937 no tournament
 1938 Victoria
 1939 Otago
 1940 Auckland
 1941 Otago
 1942 no tournament
 1943 no tournament
 1944 no tournament
 1945 Canterbury
 1946 Otago
 1947 Auckland
 1948 Canterbury
 1949 Otago
 1950 Otago
 1951 Auckland
 1952 Otago
 1953 Otago
 1954 Otago
 1955 Otago
 1956 Otago
 1957 Otago
 1958 Otago
 1959 No tournament
 1960 Canterbury
 1961 Otago
 1962 Auckland
 1963 Otago
 1964 Otago
 1965 Otago
 1966 Otago
 1967 Otago
 1968 Otago
 1969 no engraving
 1970 Otago
 1971 Otago
 1972 no tournament
 1973 no tournament
 1974 Otago
 1975 Otago
 1976 Otago
 1977 Victoria
 1978 Canterbury
 1979 Auckland
 1980 Otago
 1981 Otago
 1982 Auckland
 1983 Otago
 1984 Victoria
 1985 Massey
 1986 Otago
 1987 Waikato
 1988 Canterbury
 1989 Auckland
 1990 Otago at Otago
 1991 Victoria at Victoria
 1992 No tournament - meningitis
 1993 Otago at Canterbury
 1994 Waikato at Waikato
 1995 Canterbury at Lincoln
 1996 Waikato at Massey
 1997 Otago at Otago
 1998 Victoria at Victoria
 1999 Canterbury at Canterbury
 2000 Victoria at Victoria
 2001 Otago at Otago
 2002 Auckland at Waikato
 2003 Massey at Massey
 2004 Otago at Otago
 2005 AUT at North Shore
 2006 Victoria at Wellington
 2007 Canterbury at Christchurch
 2008 Victoria at Rotorua
 2009 Victoria at Taranaki

References

External links
 University Sport New Zealand

Recurring sporting events established in 1902
Student sport in New Zealand
Multi-sport events in New Zealand
Autumn events in New Zealand